The Baltic Futsal Cup is a Futsal competition among the national teams of the Baltic countries. The competition is hosted by the UEFA.

Not to be confused with club Baltic Futsal League, a competition contested by clubs of the Baltic countries.

Summary

Medal table 
Medal table after the 2021 tournament

General statistics 
As of 2017.

See also 
 Baltic Cup (football)
 Women's Baltic Cup
 Under-21 Baltic Cup
 Under-19 Baltic Cup
 Under-17 Baltic Cup
 Baltic Futsal League (in Russian)

References 

 
International futsal competitions
Sport in the Baltic states
Recurring sporting events established in 2008